SIMAD University is a private university in Mogadishu, Somalia. It offers undergraduate courses. It is the first non-profit university teaching in the Somali language.

History
In 1999, SIMAD was established as an institute of higher learning. After 11 years, the Board of Trustees upgraded the institute into a full-fledged university on January 20, 2011.

Governance and management
The supreme governance bodies of the university are made up of:

Board of Trustees
University Senate
Academic Council
Operations Board
Development Board

Faculties
Faculty of Management Science
Bachelor of Business Administration
Bachelor of Banking & Finance
Bachelor of Procurement & Logistics
Faculty of Computing
Bachelor of Computer Science
Bachelor of Information Technology
Bachelor of Graphics and Multimedia
Faculty of Social Sciences
Bachelor of Public Administration
Bachelor of Developmental Studies
Bachelor of Social Work and Administration 
Bachelor of Media and Communication 
Bachelor of Political Science & International Relations
Faculty of Economics
Bachelor of Economics
Bachelor of Statistics and Planning
Bachelor of International Trade and Investment 
Faculty of Law
Bachelor of Law (LLB)
Faculty of Education
Bachelor of Science Education (Biology and Chemistry)
Bachelor of Science Education Management
Bachelor of Science Education (Mathematics and Chemistry)
Bachelor of Arts Education (English and Literature)
Faculty of Engineering
Bachelor of Civil Engineering
Bachelor of Electrical Engineering
Bachelor of Telecommunication Engineering
Bachelor of Science in Architecture
Faculty of Accountancy
Bachelor of Accounting
Faculty of Medicine & Health Sciences
Bachelor of Medicine
Bachelor of Nursing
Bachelor of Microbiology and Laboratory Sciences
Bachelor of Public Health
Bachelor of Midwifery

Source:

Memberships
International Association of Schools
Somali Research and Education Network (SomaliREN)
Association of African Universities (AAU)
Arab States Research and Education Network (ASREN)
ARAB-ACRAO
World Engagement WEInstitute
Association of Somali Universities

Partnerships
Open University Malaysia (OUM), Malaysia
Shinawatra University, Thailand 
Multimedia University, Malaysia
International Islamic University, Malaysia
Sudan University of Science and Technology, Sudan
Makerere University Business School (MUBS), Uganda
Daffodil International University, Bangladesh

Accreditation
SIMAD is registered as a private, non-profit higher education institution under the Ministry of Education, Higher Education and Culture (Somalia).

Notable former and current administrators
Hassan Sheikh Mohamud – Former President of the Federal Republic of Somalia; founder and former principal of SIMAD
Faarah Sheikh Abdulkadir – Former Minister of State House; former lecturer and board member
Abdikarim Hussein Guled – Minister of Interior; board member
Abdurahman Mohamed Hussein (Odowaa), Former Minister of Internal Affairs and Federalism of the Federal Republic of Somalia; former Rector of SIMAD University

References

Universities in Somalia
1999 establishments in Somalia
Educational institutions established in 1999
Universities in Mogadishu